The Dukedom of Cádiz is a title of Spanish nobility. Its name refers to the Andalusian city of Cádiz.

History
Rodrigo Ponce de León was a Castilian military leader who was granted the title of Duke of Cádiz in 1484. After the death of the first duke in 1492, the Catholic Monarchs negotiated with Francisca Ponce de León y de la Fuente regarding the abolition of the Marquisate and Duchy of Cádiz, reinstating the city and the titles to the crown after her death.

For centuries, the title remained in abeyance, until the nineteenth century. Since then, the title was held by members of the Spanish branch of the House of Bourbon.

The title is created by the Head of the Spanish State, Francisco Franco, in favor of Alfonso de Borbón (first-born son of the infante Jacques, Duke of Anjou and Segovia), who receives his title by decree for the birth of his son Francois. However, Royal Decree No. 1.368, of November 6, 1987, of King Juan Carlos I made the lifetime title and the predicate of royal highness non-transferable to “spouses [and] children” (transitory provisions). It returned to the Crown on the death of Alfonso de Borbón.

List of holders

References

Sources
 Juan Martina Torres, The History of Spanish Nobility, 1500–present (Madrid 2009), for the: Universidad Complutense de Madrid (UCM) (translated title)
Suppression of the Duchy of Cádiz (Spanish)

 
Dukedoms of Spain